Leon Duane Hapgood (born 7 August 1979) is an English football manager and former player who serves as technical director and coach of Canadian club Cavalry FC.

As a player, he represented England Schoolboys.

Playing career
Hapgood was born in Torquay and began his career as an apprentice with Torquay United, scoring on his league debut in September 1997 while still an apprentice, coming on as a 38th-minute substitute for the injured Steve McCall in the 3–0 win at Plainmoor against Brighton & Hove Albion.

He turned professional in May 1998, but played only a peripheral role in Wes Saunders' side the following season. In June 1999 he was offered a three-month contract by Torquay, but was released in August, almost immediately teaming up with his former manager Kevin Hodges on trial at Plymouth Argyle. He signed non-contract terms with the Pilgrims, but was allowed to join former Torquay player Sean William Joyce's Bideford on loan in November 1999. On 7 February 2000 he joined Conference side Yeovil Town after failing to break into the Plymouth first team.

In June 2000 he moved to Taunton Town, managed by former Torquay player Russell Musker, playing as a substitute in Taunton's 2-1 FA Vase Final win over Berkhamsted Town on 6 May 2001 at Villa Park.

He subsequently moved to Merthyr Tydfil in December 2001. At the end of that season he moved to the United States to work as a coach, returning to the UK to play for Taunton in October 2002. He moved to Bideford in February 2003, initially on loan as he recovered from injury, and left Bideford to join Clevedon Town in June 2004.

On 10 January 2007 he rejoined Torquay United on an initial one-month contract, which was later extended for a second month. However, he was released by Torquay on 11 March 2007 when his contract expired. After starting the 2007–2008 season with Liskeard Athletic, he subsequently re-joined Bideford.

Managerial career
Hapgood resumed his North American coaching career in August 2008 with Calgary Foothills. In 2018, after the departure of Tommy Wheeldon Jr. to Cavalry FC, Hapgood was appointed technical director of USL League Two side Calgary Foothills. The following year, he began working as a part-time assistant coach with Cavalry FC. On 15 February 2022, Hapgood departed Foothills to join Cavalry FC full-time as the club's technical director.

References

External links

1979 births
Living people
Association football midfielders
English footballers
Sportspeople from Torquay
Torquay United F.C. players
Plymouth Argyle F.C. players
Yeovil Town F.C. players
Merthyr Tydfil F.C. players
Taunton Town F.C. players
Bideford A.F.C. players
Clevedon Town F.C. players
Liskeard Athletic F.C. players
English Football League players
English football managers
English expatriate football managers
Expatriate soccer managers in the United States
English expatriate sportspeople in the United States
Expatriate soccer managers in Canada
English expatriate sportspeople in Canada
Cavalry FC non-playing staff